Dáil Éireann is the lower house, and principal chamber, of the Oireachtas (Irish legislature), which also includes the President of Ireland and Seanad Éireann (the upper house). TDs represent 39 constituencies and are directly elected for terms not exceeding five years, on the system of proportional representation by means of the single transferable vote (PR-STV). Its powers are similar to those of lower houses under many other bicameral parliamentary systems and it is by far the dominant branch of the Oireachtas. Subject to the limits imposed by the Constitution of Ireland, it has power to pass any law it wishes, and to nominate and remove the Taoiseach (head of government). Since 1922, it has met in Leinster House in Dublin.

The Dáil took its current form when the 1937 Constitution was adopted, but it maintains continuity with the First Dáil established in 1919.

Composition
The Dáil has 160 members. The number is set within the limits of the Constitution of Ireland, which sets a minimum ratio of one member per 20,000 of the population, and a maximum of one per 30,000. Under current legislation, members are directly elected for terms not exceeding five years by the people of Ireland under a system of proportional representation known as the single transferable vote. Membership of the Dáil is open to Irish citizens who are 21 or older.

The Dáil electorate consists of Irish and British citizens over 18 years of age who are registered to vote in Ireland. Under the Constitution a general election for Dáil Éireann must occur once in every seven years, an earlier maximum of five years is set by the Electoral Act 1992. The Taoiseach (head of government or prime minister) can, at any time, make a request to the president to dissolve the Dáil, in which case a general election must occur within thirty days. The President may refuse to grant the dissolution to a Taoiseach who has ceased to retain the support of a majority in the Dáil; to date, no request for a dissolution has been refused.

The STV electoral system broadly produces proportional representation in the Dáil. The small size of the constituencies used, however, usually gives a small advantage to the larger parties and under-represents smaller parties. Since the 1990s the norm in the state has been coalition governments. Prior to 1989, however, one-party government by the Fianna Fáil party was common. The multi-seat constituencies required by STV mean that candidates must often compete for election with others from the same party. (The contest is not zero-sum though, as two or more candidates of the same party can all be elected.) This system offers wide voter choice but is accused by some of producing TDs who are excessively parochial. By-elections occur under the alternative vote system. Proposals to amend the constitution to change to the First-past-the-post voting system were rejected in referendums in 1959 and in 1968.

Currently every constituency elects between three and five TDs. The constitution specifies that no constituency may return fewer than three TDs but does not specify any upper limit to constituency magnitude. However, statute specifies a maximum of five seats per constituency. The constitution requires that constituency boundaries be reviewed at least once in every twelve years, so that boundaries may be redrawn to accommodate changes in population. Boundary changes are currently drafted by an independent commission, and its recommendations are implemented by law. Malapportionment is forbidden by the constitution. Under the Constitution, the commission is required to refer to the most recent Census when considering boundary changes.

Number of members

The Constituency Commission which reported in 2017, recommended a total of 160 TDs, which based on the 2016 census gave an average representation of 29,762 of population per member. This report was implemented by the Electoral (Amendment) (Dáil Constituencies) Act 2017 and took effect at the 2020 general election. This ratio is in line with that of many other European Union member state national parliaments' ratios, giving Ireland a similar MP-to-citizen ratio to Bulgaria, the Czech Republic, Denmark, Finland, Hungary, Latvia, Lithuania and Sweden. (At the two extremes of the EU range, Malta has one MP for every 6,000 citizens and Spain one MP for every 130,000 citizens).

Layout
The Dáil chamber has confrontational benches but the end segment is curved to create a partial hemicycle. The government TDs sit on the left of the Ceann Comhairle, with the main opposition party on their right. The Chamber was adapted for use as a Parliament from its former use as a lecture theatre.

Duration
The First Dáil was established on 21 January 1919 as the single-chamber parliament of the Irish Republic. One of the first actions of the Dáil was to ratify a constitution, commonly known as the Dáil Constitution. As a provisional constitution it made no reference to the length of the term of each Dáil. The first and second Dáil existed under the provisions of this constitution. Neither was recognised by the British government or the governments of other countries as the lawful parliament of Ireland.

Following the signing of the 1922 Anglo-Irish Treaty, which brought the Irish War of Independence to an end, the single chamber Dáil became the lower house of a new bicameral Oireachtas, the parliament of the newly established Irish Free State. Under the treaty, a new constitution replaced the 1919 Dáil constitution.

Article 28 of the Constitution of the Irish Free State (1922) set the maximum term for the Dáil at four years. This was amended in 1927 from four years to six years "or such shorter period as may be fixed by legislation". Later that same year, this period was fixed in law as a duration of "five years reckoned from the date of the first meeting of Dáil Éireann after the last previous dissolution".

On 29 December 1937, the Irish Free State ceased to exist and was replaced by a new state called Ireland, with the coming into force of the new Constitution of Ireland. Article 16.5 of the 1937 constitution states that "Dáil Éireann shall not continue for a longer period than seven years from the date of its first meeting: a shorter period may be fixed by law". The period in law remained at five years. Since the coming info force of the 1937 constitution, no Irish government has proposed changing the maximum term of the Dáil, which still remains five years and was reconfirmed by legislation in 1992, which stated, "The same Dáil shall not continue for a longer period than five years from the date of its first meeting". The acceptance of five years as the maximum term for any single Dáil was reconfirmed by section 33 of the Electoral Act 1992, which states  Consequently, the maximum term for the Dáil is five years from the date it first met following the last general election.

Dissolution
Article 16.3.2º of the Constitution of Ireland (1937) provides that an election for the membership of Dáil Éireann must take place not later than 30 days after a dissolution of the current Dáil. Article 16.4.2º requires that the newly elected Dáil Éireann must convene no later than 30 days after the polling day for the election. As such, the maximum period of time between a dissolution of Dáil Éireann before a general election and the meeting of the new Dáil after a general election is 60 days.

The procedure and timetable for the dissolution of Dáil Éireann, pursuant to a general election, and the date for the reassembly of the newly elected Dáil, after the election, is set out in the Constitution of Ireland. Article 13.2.1º states that "Dáil Éireann shall be summoned and dissolved by the President on the advice of the Taoiseach". Therefore, the timing of a general election rests with the Taoiseach of the day.

Once so advised by the Taoiseach, the President issues a proclamation which specifies the date on which the current Dáil is dissolved, and the date on which the newly elected Dáil must first meet.

The timing for polling day in a general election is decided on by the Taoiseach. However, this is governed within a specified statutory framework. Once the Presidential proclamation is issued, the Minister for Housing, Planning and Local Government sets, by way of a ministerial order, the date and time of polling day in the election.

Section 39(1) of the Electoral Act 1992 states:

"Where the Dáil is dissolved, the Clerk of the Dáil shall, immediately upon the issue of the Proclamation dissolving the Dáil, issue a writ to each returning officer for a constituency directing him to cause an election to be held of the full number of members of the Dáil to serve in the Dáil for that constituency."

Section 96 of the Electoral Act 1992 states:
"(1) A poll at a Dáil election—
(a) shall be taken on such day as shall be appointed by the Minister by order, being a day which (disregarding any excluded day) is not earlier than the seventeenth day or later than the twenty-fifth day next following the day on which the writ or writs for the election is or are issued,
(b) shall continue for such period, not being less than twelve hours, between the hours of 8 a.m. and 10.30 p.m. as may be fixed by the Minister by order, subject to the restriction that, in the case of a general election, he shall fix the same period for all constituencies.

For the purposes of the Act an "excluded day" means a day which is a Sunday, Good Friday or a day which is declared to be a public holiday by the Holidays (Employees) Act 1973, or a day which by virtue of a statute or proclamation is a public holiday.

Therefore, if the Dáil were dissolved on a Tuesday 1 February (in a non-leap year), and the writs for elections issued by the Clerk of the Dáil on that day, then the earliest date for polling day would be Monday 21 February (17 days later, excluding Sundays) and the latest date for polling would be Wednesday 2 March (25 days after, excluding Sundays), with polling stations being open for a minimum 12-hour period between the hours of 8am and 10.30pm on polling day (as set out in the ministerial order). In such a scenario, the latest date by which the newly elected Dáil must assemble would be Wednesday 23 March (for a 21 February polling date), or Friday 1 April (for a 2 March polling date).

Title
The name  is taken from the Irish language but is the official title of the body in both English and Irish, including in both language versions of the Irish constitution. Since the Dáil was first established in 1919, it has also been described variously as a "National Assembly", a "Chamber of Deputies"  and a "House of Representatives".

A  means a "meeting, tryst or encounter of any kind". Article 15 of the 1937 Constitution describes the body as "a House of Representatives to be called Dáil Éireann" (Teach Ionadóirí ar a dtugtar Dáil Éireann).

The word Dáil is accompanied by the definite article, but Dáil Éireann is not; one speaks of "the Dáil" but not "the Dáil Éireann". The plural of Dáil in the English language is most commonly Dáils, although the Irish-language plural Dálaí is sometimes encountered in English. As there is only ever one Dáil in existence at any one time, the plural is used when referring to the Dáil after different elections; for example, when referring to the First and Second Dáils.

Ceann Comhairle

The chairman, or presiding member, of the Dáil is the Ceann Comhairle. The Ceann Comhairle is chosen from among TDs but is required to observe strict impartiality. Despite this, the government will usually try to select one of its own for the position, if its numbers allow. To protect the neutrality of the chair, an incumbent Ceann Comhairle does not seek re-election as a TD but rather is deemed automatically to have been re-elected by their constituency at a general election, unless they are retiring. The Ceann Comhairle does not vote except in the event of a tie. The current Ceann Comhairle is Fianna Fáil TD Seán Ó Fearghaíl.

Powers
While the Dáil is one of three components of the Oireachtas, the other two being the President of Ireland and Seanad Éireann, the powers the constitution grants to the Dáil render it by far the dominant branch, meaning that most bills passed by the Dáil will ultimately become law. The President may refer a bill to the Supreme Court of Ireland to test its constitutionality upon consultation with the Council of State. If the Court finds that the bill is inconsistent with the Constitution, the bill does not become law.

In addition to its legislative role, it is the Dáil that approves the nomination the Taoiseach for appointment by the President. The Dáil may also pass a motion of no confidence in the Government, in which case the Taoiseach must either seek a parliamentary dissolution or resign. It has happened only once that the loss of confidence of the Dáil did not result in a general election: in 1994 John Bruton of Fine Gael became Taoiseach when the Labour Party left the Fianna Fáil coalition government led by Albert Reynolds.

The Dáil has exclusive power to:
Nominate the Taoiseach for appointment by the president;
Approve the Taoiseach's nominees  to serve as Government ministers on their appointment by the president;
Approve the budget;
Initiate bills to amend the Constitution;
Ratify treaties which include financial provisions (Provided they do not conflict with the Constitution of Ireland);
Approve a declaration of war;
Initiate 'money bills' or bills which incur a charge on the public finances (on the recommendation of the Government only);
Nominate the Comptroller and Auditor General

Activities

The Dáil determines its own standing orders and its members are protected by certain rights arising from parliamentary privilege. In line with other modern parliamentary systems, TDs do not generally vote in accordance with their consciences or the wishes of their constituents, but must follow the instructions of party whips, a practice that originated in the Irish Parliamentary Party. Except in exceptional circumstances, the Dáil meets in public. The Dáil currently has three standing committees and thirteen select committees.

As of 2019, the Dáil sits on Tuesdays, Wednesdays and Thursdays when the Oireachtas is sitting. On Tuesdays the Dáil normally sits from 2pm until 11pm, on Wednesdays from 9.12am until around 11.30pm and on Thursdays from 9am until around 8pm.

A typical day consists of questions to various cabinet ministers, Leaders’ questions whereby opposition Leaders ask the Taoiseach questions and routine debates on Bills. Every Tuesday and Wednesday three hours over the two days are given to the debate of opposition motions. These normally try to embarrass the government and are widely covered in the media. The government and its Majority normally amends these suitably and the amended version is passed by the Government.

Debate and speeches are generally in English, but TDs may switch between Irish and English.

Standards of conduct 
The Ceann Comhairle has ruled that it is disorderly for one deputy to describe another as a brat, buffoon, chancer, communist, corner boy, coward, fascist, gurrier, guttersnipe, hypocrite, rat, scumbag, scurrilous speaker or yahoo; or to insinuate that a TD is lying or drunk; or has violated the secrets of cabinet, or doctored an official report. Also, the reference to "handbagging", particularly with reference to a female member of the House, has been deemed to be unparliamentary.
The Dáil maintains a document, Salient Rulings of the Chair which covers behaviour in and out of the House by TDs; section 428 of this lists unparliamentary speech.

Committees

Standing committees
Committee on Administration
Committee on Consolidation Bills
Committee on Members' Interests of Dáil Éireann
Committee on Procedure and Privileges
Sub-committee on Compellability
Sub-committee on Dáil Reform
Committee of Public Accounts

Select committees

Select committee on Communications, Natural Resources and Agriculture
Select sub-committee on Communications, Energy and Natural Resources
Select sub-committee on Agriculture, Marine and Food
Select committee on Environment, Transport, Culture and the Gaeltacht
Select sub-committee on Environment, Community and Local Government
Select sub-committee on Transport, Tourism and Sport
Select sub-committee on Arts, Heritage and the Gaeltacht
Select committee on European Union Affairs
Select committee on Foreign Affairs and Trade
Select committee on Finance, Public Expenditure and Reform
Select sub-committee on Finance
Select sub-committee on Public Expenditure and Reform
Select committee on Health and Children
Select sub-committee on Health
Select Sub-committee on Children and Youth Affairs
Select committee on the Implementation of the Good Friday Agreement
Select committee on Investigations, Oversight and Petitions
Select committee on Jobs, Social Protection and Education
Select sub-committee on Jobs, Enterprise and Innovation
Select sub-committee on Social Protection
Select sub-committee on Education and Skills
Select committee on Justice, Defence and Equality

Special committees 

 Special Committee on COVID-19 Response

Voting procedure
The Ceann Comhairle then gives his opinion as to the outcome of the voice vote. Deputies can challenge the Ceann Comhairle and demand a recorded vote by shouting  (Vote!) The Ceann Comhairle then shouts  again which starts the voting process. Division bells sound around Leinster House and in some of its adjoining buildings calling deputies to the chamber to vote. The bells ring for six minutes and the doors to the chamber are locked after a further four minutes.

The Ceann Comhairle then appoints two tellers for each side and deputies are given one minute to vote. The vote is taken by electronic means whereby Deputies press either the Tá or Níl button on their desks to vote for or against a motion. After the voting time has concluded a sheet (Division Paper) containing the result and each TDs vote is signed by the four tellers and given to the Ceann Comhairle who declares the result.

While electronic voting has become the norm the Dáil votes manually through the lobbies at the back of the chamber on a number of occasions, for example, motions of no confidence. A teller in an electronic vote can call a manual vote if they so wish. This has become an opposition tactic during important votes which are widely covered in the media.

History

Precursors
The first legislature to exist in Ireland was the Parliament of Ireland from 1297 to 1800, and its house of representatives was the House of Commons. However the Parliament of Ireland was abolished under the Act of Union of 1800, with MPs elected for Ireland sitting in the House of Commons of the United Kingdom until 1922. Irish nationalists first convened Dáil Éireann as a revolutionary parliament in 1919 and while it successfully took over most functions of government it was not recognised under United Kingdom law.

In 1921 the United Kingdom government established a legislature called the Parliament of Southern Ireland in an effort to appease nationalists by granting Ireland limited home rule. However this body was rejected and boycotted by nationalists whose allegiance remained with the Dáil. Nonetheless, because the First Dáil was illegal under the United Kingdom constitution, the lower house of the Parliament of Southern Ireland, the House of Commons of Southern Ireland, is considered in British legal theory as the precursor to the Dáil.

Revolutionary Dáil (1919–1922)

The current Dáil derives from the 1937 Constitution of Ireland, but maintain continuity from the First Dáil of 1919. This Dáil was an assembly established by Sinn Féin MPs elected to the House of Commons of the United Kingdom in the 1918 United Kingdom general election. They had contested the election on a manifesto commitment of "[establishing] a constituent assembly comprising persons chosen by Irish constituencies as the supreme national authority to speak and act in the name of the Irish people". Upon winning 73 of the 105 Irish seats in the election, Sinn Féin MPs refused to recognise the United Kingdom parliament and instead convened as Dáil Éireann (translated as "Assembly of Ireland"): the unicameral legislature of a unilaterally declared Irish Republic, and the first Irish parliament to exist since 1801.

The Dáil of the Irish Republic, however, was only recognised internationally by the Russian Soviet Federative Socialist Republic. The first meeting of the Dáil occurred in Dublin on 21 January 1919, in the Mansion House, attended by 27 members. The body was prohibited in the following September, and was forced underground, meeting in several locations.

Irish Free State (1922–1937)

The Dáil of the Irish Republic was succeeded on 6 December 1922 by the Dáil of the Irish Free State. The Irish Free State, comprising the twenty-six southern and western counties of Ireland, was established under the 1921 Anglo-Irish Treaty. Dáil Éireann was the house of representatives, described in the new constitution as a "Chamber of Deputies, of a bicameral legislature called the Oireachtas of the Irish Free State. The first Dáil to exist under the Constitution of the Irish Free State succeeded the Second Dáil of the Irish Republic and so was styled the Third Dáil. The Third Dáil, and every subsequent Dáil, has met in Leinster House.

Constitution of Ireland (since 1937)
The Constitution of Ireland, adopted in 1937, established the modern Irish state, referred to today as Ireland. Under the constitution a new legislature retained the title Oireachtas, and its lower house remained Dáil Éireann. The first Dáil to meet under the Constitution of Ireland was described as the Ninth Dáil.

During the COVID-19 pandemic and the necessity for social distancing, the Dáil temporarily sat at the Convention Centre Dublin from June 2020 to July 2021. From September 2021, the Dáil returned to sitting in Leinster House.

Current composition

See also
Bicameralism
Dáil election results
Elections in the Republic of Ireland
Current Irish government
History of the Republic of Ireland
Politics of the Republic of Ireland
Records of members of the Oireachtas

Notes

References

External links
Houses of the Oireachtas – Official website
Members of Dáil Éireann 1919 to the present – Oireachtas website

 
1919 establishments in Ireland
Ireland
Oireachtas